Carmen Rubio (born 1973) is an American politician and non-profit executive in the U.S. state of Oregon who is currently a Portland City Commissioner, having taken office on the Portland City Council in late December 2020. She had previously served as the executive director of the Latino Network since 2009.

Early life and education
Rubio was born and raised in Hillsboro, Oregon. She is of Mexican descent. Rubio graduated with a degree in political science from the University of Oregon in 1999.

Career 

Rubio began her public service career in the offices of Multnomah County Commissioner Serena Cruz, Portland Mayor Tom Potter, and Portland City Commissioner Nick Fish. She served as a policy advisor and worked to engage Portlanders on critical issues. Beginning in 2009, she served as the executive director of the Latino Network, a non-profit organization that advocated for Portland's growing Latino community.

Rubio ran for Portland City Council in spring 2020, in a race to fill the seat then held by Amanda Fritz. In the May primary election, she defeated Candace Avalos, an administrator at Portland State University, to win election to a term that was officially to begin in January 2021. She was sworn into office a few days before that, on December 28, 2020.

References

External links

Commissioner Carmen Rubio on City of Portland website

1973 births
Living people
21st-century American politicians
21st-century American women politicians
American politicians of Mexican descent
Hispanic and Latino American women in politics
Hispanic and Latino American city council members
Hispanic and Latino American people in Oregon politics
Politicians from Hillsboro, Oregon
Portland City Council members (Oregon)
University of Oregon alumni
Women city councillors in Oregon